Luber is an unincorporated community in Stone County, Arkansas, United States. The Luber School, which is listed on the National Register of Historic Places, is located in Luber.

References

Unincorporated communities in Stone County, Arkansas
Unincorporated communities in Arkansas